Persian Gulf Complex is the 12th  largest shopping mall in the world, located in Shiraz, Iran. 

It is the  second biggest mall in terms of the number of shops after Iran Mall.

Description 
The facility has space for 2,500 stores covering .

The complex includes the Burj Fars International, a 262-room hotel, an indoor and outdoor swimming pool, tennis court, convention centre and a helipad. In addition, there are two amusement parks at the mall, an outdoor amusement park called Iran Land, covering , and an indoor amusement park covering  with video games, a bowling alley and a 3-story billiard hall. The mall also has six 240-seat cinema. A  Carrefour Hypermarket is also located within the mall. The complex has four floors of parking space that can accommodate a total of 5,500 vehicles.

Management 
The Persian Gulf Complex is managed by Royal Star International (Setareh Trading Complex).

References

External links

Shopping malls in Iran
Shopping malls established in 2011
Buildings and structures in Shiraz
Tourist attractions in Shiraz